Tommaso Debenedetti (born in 1969) is an Italian writer and a schoolteacher in Rome who is known for writing fake news. He is a father of two children.

Hoaxes

Interviews 
Debenedetti wrote many fake interviews, published by writers such as Grisham, Saramago, Vargas Llosa, and Yehoshua, and interviewing personalities such as Gorbachev, the Dalai Lama and Pope Benedict XVI. The interviews were published for decades in Italian regional newspapers.

Fake news 
Since 2011, Debenedetti has created fake Twitter accounts of famous world personalities, spreading fake news. In 2012, a hoax announcing the death of Syrian president Assad created a global rise in the price of oil. Other Debenedetti Twitter hoaxes were picked by important news sources, fooling many newspapers, including The New York Times, The Guardian, USA Today, and Neue Zürcher Zeitung, as well as world leaders and organizations. In June 2020, Benedetti published fake tweet about death of Milan Kundera under Twitter account pretending to be of Petr Drulák, former Czech ambassador to France. The information had been published by Polish newspaper Gazeta Wyborcza, but it was subsequently denied by Kundera's family, Czech embassy in France and Drulák himself. In March 2022, he falsely reported the death of author Kazuo Ishiguro using a Twitter account pretending to be that of Faber and Faber. The story was reported as fact by RTÉ Radio 1's Morning Ireland show and was later corrected by Ryan Tubridy on the same radio channel. In 2022, he created a fake Twitter account in which he claimed that Pope Benedict XVI had died.

Response 
Debenedetti explained he did it "to show how easy it is to fool the press in the era of social media". Mario Vargas Llosa, in his essay Notes of the death of culture (written in 2015) quoted Debenedetti as "an hero of the civilization of the spectacle".

References 

1969 births
Living people
Hoaxes in Italy
Hoaxers